FC Spartak Vladikavkaz  was a Russian football club based in Vladikavkaz (formerly Ordzhonikidze), North Ossetia–Alania. Founded in 1921, the club played in the Soviet Top League during the communist era, and won its first and only league title in the 1995 Russian Top League.

History
At dissolution of the Soviet Union, Spartak Vladikavkaz were the only non-Muscovite Russian club competing in the old Soviet Top League. This had been their second and last season in the STL.  Before that the only other season they competed in the top Soviet division was in 1970.

Their most successful season was 1995 when they managed to win the Russian Premier League champions title after several years of domination by Spartak Moscow. They were the first non-Muscovite Russian club to win the title since Zenit St Petersburg won the STL in 1984. The team had previously won a silver medal for second place in 1992 and 1996. However, in the qualification stages of the UEFA Champions League Alania lost 10–3 on aggregate to the Scottish club Rangers.

However, after departure of manager Valery Gazzaev and several players from the club, Alania were not able to repeat its success, finishing in the bottom half of the table.

Previously, the club was known as Spartak Ordzhonikidze (1937–1990), Spartak Vladikavkaz (1990–1994, 2006 and from 2016), Spartak-Alania Vladikavkaz (1995–1996 and 2003), Alania Vladikavkaz (1997–2002, 2004–2005 and from 2007 to 2016).

In season 2005 Alania was relegated from Russian Premier League after 15 seasons of top-flight football.

On 14 February 2006 Alania and another First Division club, Lokomotiv Chita, were denied professional licences by Professional Football League and excluded from professional football for juridical irregularities. On 22 February PFL decided to replace Alania and Lokomotiv with Lada Togliatti and Mashuk-KMV Pyatigorsk, the runners-up in the Second Division. The Russian Football Union did not endorse the exclusion and on 28 February decided to keep Alania and Lokomotiv in the First Division, giving them another chance to fulfill the league requirements. Consequently, on 6 March PFL decided to extend the First Division from 22 to 24 clubs, including Alania, Lokomotiv, Lada, and Mashuk-KMV.

However, on 20 March the Russian Football Union finally decided to exclude Alania and Lokomotiv from the league. This decision was announced by the Professional Football League on 21 March, five days before the start of the First Division.

Alania underwent reorganization, were renamed Spartak Vladikavkaz and on 4 April were admitted into the Russian Second Division, South zone.

After finishing first in the South Zone of 2nd division in the 2006 the team was promoted to Russian First Division and again renamed to Alania.

In 2009, Alania achieved 3rd place in the Russian First Division, just below the nominal promotion places. However, due to FC Moscow being expelled from the Russian Premier League, Alania were chosen to take their place. Their season back in the top flight was not successful and only Sibir Novosibirsk finished below them, thus going back to the First Division; despite the subsequent withdrawal of Amkar Perm and Saturn Moscow Oblast, Alania was refused a reprieve by the RPL.

In the spring of 2011, Alania qualified for the final of the 2010–11 Russian Cup, where it met PFC CSKA Moscow. CSKA already qualified for the UEFA Champions League spot, and therefore Alania secured a spot in the 2011–12 UEFA Europa League regardless of the final result. That is the second occasion in Russian football history when a second-level division team qualified for European competition (the first one was FC Terek Grozny). Alania achieved a rare feat of reaching the cup final without scoring a single regular-time goal. On three occasions they won a penalty shootout after playing the game with a score of 0–0 and once they received a bye after their opponent team went bankrupt.

In February 2014, Alania pulled out of the 2013–14 Russia First Division, due to financial liquidation and sponsorship problems, and the club was dissolved. Before the 2014–15 season, former Alania's farm club, FC Alania-d Vladikavkaz, was renamed to Alania, and this club participated in the Russian Professional Football League from the 2014–15 season.

Before the 2016–17 season, FC Alania Vladikavkaz that participated in the third-tier Russian Professional Football League was dissolved and a formally new club called FC Spartak was organized again and registered for PFL. PFL did not allow the club to register with 'Alania' in their name due to accumulated debts for the club of that name.

Before the 2019–20 season, a new club was created with the historical name Alania that was privately owned, the team was tasked with returning to the elite of Russian football. However, Spartak Vladikavkaz also remained in the Russian Professional Football League for the 2019–20, where it finished in last place, before being dissolved in the summer of 2020.

European

Honours
 Russian Premier League
Winners (1): 1995
Runners-up (2): 1992, 1996
 Russian Cup
Runners-up (1): 2010–11
Soviet First League
Winners (2): 1969, 1990
Russian Football National League
Runners-up (1): 2011–12
Soviet Second League / Russian Professional Football League
Winners (2): 1983, 2006
Runners-up (2): 1966, 1982

League history

Soviet Union
{|class="wikitable" style="text-align: center;"
|- style="background:#efefef;"
! Season
! Div.
! Pos.
! Pl.
! W
! D
! L
! GS
! GA
! P
!Cup
!colspan=2|Europe
!Top Scorer (League)
|-
||1960||2nd, RSFSR-3||14||26||3||4||19||26||68||10||-||colspan="2"|-||
|-
||1961||2nd, RSFSR-4||10||24||6||6||12||32||57||18||1/64||colspan="2"|-||
|-
||1962||2nd, RSFSR-3|| style="background:pink;"|8||28||10||6||12||38||36||26||1/128||colspan="2"|-||
|-
||1963||3rd, RSFSR-3||7||30||12||8||10||47||39||32||1/512||colspan="2"|-||
|-
|rowspan="2"|1964||3rd, RSFSR-4||4||34||16||7||11||53||35||39||rowspan="2"|1/512||rowspan="2" colspan="2"|-||
|-
||3rd, RSFSR-final||4||8||3||2||3||9||10||8||
|-
||1965||rowspan="2"|3rd, RSFSR-4||9||38||16||7||15||54||43||39||-||colspan="2"|-||
|-
|rowspan="2"|1966||1||38||22||9||7||80||40||53||rowspan="2"|1/32||rowspan="2" colspan="2"|-||
|-
||3rd, RSFSR-final|| style="background:lightgreen;"|2||7||4||1||2||9||4||9||
|-
||1967||2nd, group 1||16||38||10||11||17||34||45||31||1/32||colspan="2"|-||
|-
||1968||2nd, group 3||2||40||19||12||9||53||29||50||1/64||colspan="2"|-||align="left"| Kaishauri: 18
|-
|rowspan="2"|1969||2nd, group 1||1||38||22||12||4||60||25||60||rowspan="2"|1/64||rowspan="2" colspan="2"|-|| rowspan="2" style="text-align:left;"| Papelishvili: 16
|-
||2nd, final|| style="background:lightgreen;"|1||3||2||0||1||4||2||4
|-
||1970||Top League|| style="background:pink;"|17||32||7||8||17||31||48||22||1/16||colspan="2"|-||align="left"| Kaishauri: 8
|-
||1971||rowspan="11"|2nd||5||42||19||7||16||52||57||45||1/16||colspan="2"|-||align="left"| Zazroev: 11
|-
||1972||9||38||14||10||14||49||50||38||1/16||colspan="2"|-||align="left"| Kaishauri: 18
|-
||1973||17||38||13||7||18||29||44||30||1/16||colspan="2"|-||align="left"| Kaishauri: 7
|-
||1974||17||38||15||4||19||45||67||34||1/32||colspan="2"|-||align="left"| Kitaev: 17
|-
||1975||9||38||15||7||16||41||43||37||1/32||colspan="2"|-||align="left"| V. Gazzaev: 14
|-
||1976||15||38||11||14||13||40||50||36||1/32||colspan="2"|-||align="left"| Kaishauri: 11
|-
||1977||15||38||11||11||16||38||45||33||1/32||colspan="2"|-||align="left"| Khuadonov: 6
|-
||1978||18||38||10||8||20||30||50||28||1/16||colspan="2"|-||align="left"| Khuadonov: 9
|-
||1979||13||46||19||7||20||49||44||45||group stage||colspan="2"|-||align="left"| Suanov,  Zazroev: 9
|-
||1980||15||46||17||9||20||43||50||43||group stage||colspan="2"|-||align="left"| Khuadonov: 9
|-
||1981|| style="background:pink;"|21||46||14||12||20||36||49||40||group stage||colspan="2"|-||align="left"| Y. Gazzaev: 10
|-
|rowspan="2"|1982||3rd, zone 3||1||32||22||6||4||64||18||50||rowspan="2"|-||rowspan="2" colspan="2"|-||align="left"| Y. Gazzaev: 23
|-
||3rd, final-1||2||4||1||2||1||5||4||4||
|-
|rowspan="2"|1983||3rd, zone 3||1||30||23||2||5||69||23||48||rowspan="2"|-||rowspan="2" colspan="2"|-||
|-
||3rd, final-2|| style="background:lightgreen;"|1||4||1||3||0||2||0||5||
|-
||1984||rowspan="7"|2nd||16||42||15||8||19||42||51||38||1/32||colspan="2"|-||align="left"| Argudyaev: 13
|-
||1985||16||38||17||4||17||49||52||38||1/16||colspan="2"|-||align="left"| Ambalov: 12
|-
||1986||16||46||15||12||19||58||66||42||1/64||colspan="2"|-||align="left"| Ploshnik: 16
|-
||1987||18||42||12||12||18||37||46||36||1/64||colspan="2"|-||align="left"| Gagloev: 8
|-
||1988||13||42||15||9||8||57||60||39||1/32||colspan="2"|-||align="left"| Y. Gazzaev: 10
|-
||1989||17||42||12||11||19||44||61||35||1/64||colspan="2"|-||align="left"| Y. Gazzaev: 10,  Tskhovrebov: 7
|-
||1990|| style="background:lightgreen;"|1||38||24||9||5||73||30||57||1/64||colspan="2"|-||align="left"| Tedeev: 23
|-
||1991||Top League||11||30||9||8||13||33||41||26||1/64||colspan="2"|-||align="left"| Suleymanov: 13
|-
||1992||-||-||-||-||-||-||-||-||-||1/16||colspan="2"|-||
|}

Russia
{|class="wikitable" style="text-align: center;"
|- style="background:#efefef;"
! Season
! Div.
! Pos.
! Pl.
! W
! D
! L
! GS
! GA
! P
!Cup
!colspan=2|Europe
!Top Scorer (League)
|-
||1992||rowspan="14"|RFPL|| style="background:silver;"|2||26||13||6||7||47||33||32||-||colspan="2"|-||align="left"| Suleymanov: 12
|-
||1993||6||34||16||6||12||49||45||38||1/16||colspan="2"|-||align="left"| Suleymanov,  Markhel: 14
|-
||1994||5||30||11||11||8||32||34||33||1/2||UC||R1||align="left"| Suleymanov: 6
|-
||1995|| style="background:gold;"|1||30||22||5||3||63||21||71||1/2||colspan="2"|-||align="left"| Kavelashvili: 12
|-
||1996|| style="background:silver;"|2||35||22||6||7||65||37||72||1/16||UC||R1||align="left"| Suleymanov,  Tedeev,  Kasymov: 11
|-
||1997||10||34||14||4||16||52||42||46||1/8||UC||R1||align="left"| Yanovsky: 13
|-
||1998||8||30||11||7||12||46||39||40||1/2||UC||R1||align="left"| Demetradze: 14
|-
||1999||6||30||12||7||11||54||45||43||1/8||colspan="2"|-||align="left"| Demetradze: 21
|-
||2000||10||30||10||8||12||34||36||38||1/16||colspan="2"|-||align="left"| Tedeev: 10
|-
||2001||11||30||8||8||14||31||47||32||1/16||UC||R1||align="left"| Paolo Emilio: 6
|-
||2002||12||30||8||6||16||31||42||30||1/16||colspan="2"|-||align="left"| Demetradze,  D. Bazaev: 6
|-
||2003||13||30||9||4||17||23||43||31||1/16||colspan="2"|-||align="left"| Mikholap: 4
|-
||2004||14||30||7||7||16||28||52||28||1/8||colspan="2"|-||align="left"| G. Bazaev,  Tudor: 5
|-
||2005|| style="background:pink;"|15||30||5||8||17||27||53||23||1/8||colspan="2"|-||align="left"| D. Bazaev: 9
|-
||2006||3rd, "South"|| style="background:lightgreen;"|1||32||27||3||2||81||20||84||1/16||colspan="2"|-||align="left"| Dubrovin: 28
|-
||2007||rowspan="3"|2nd||12||42||15||11||16||56||56||56||1/64||colspan="2"|-||align="left"| Dubrovin: 19
|-
||2008||10||42||17||8||17||50||41||59||1/32||colspan="2"|-||align="left"| Dadu: 18
|-
||2009|| style="background:lightgreen;"|3||38||21||7||10||57||30||70||1/16||colspan="2"|-||align="left"| Dadu: 12
|-
||2010||RFPL|| style="background:pink;"|15||30||4||8||18||34||58||20|| style="background:silver;"|F||colspan="2"|-||align="left"| Gabulov,  Marenich: 4
|-
||2011–12 ||2nd|| style="background:lightgreen;"|2||52||28||13||11||66||39||97||1/32||colspan="2"|-||align="left"| Bikmaev: 11
|-
||2012–13 ||RFPL|| style="background:pink;"|16||30||4||7||19||26||53||19||1/16||colspan="2"|-||align="left"| Neco: 9
|-
||2013–14 ||2nd|| style="background:grey;"|12||36||14||4||18||29||52||46||1/16||colspan="2"|-||align="left"| Khastsayev: 13
|-
||2014–15 ||rowspan="5"|3rd, "South"||17||20||5||6||9|| |21||33||21 ||1/256||colspan="2"|-||align="left"| Burayev: 12
|-
||2015–16 ||style=";"|11||24||4||7||13||15||37||19||1/256||colspan="2"|-||align="left"| Sikoyev: 7
|-
||2016–17 ||style=";"|10||30||10||7||13||26||36||37||1/128||colspan="2"|-||align="left"| Gatikoev: 8
|-
||2017–18 ||style=";"|13||32||8||8||16||26||41||32||1/256||colspan="2"|-||align="left"| Gurtsiev: 5
|-
||2018–19 ||style=";"|10||28||8||6||14||36||48||30||1/64||colspan="2"|-||align="left"| Zhabkin: 8
|-
||2019–20 ||rowspan="5"| ||16||19||1||5||13|| |14||40||8||1/256||colspan="2"|-||align="left"|
|}

Former coaches

 Grigoriy Gornostaev (1966–1967)
 Mussa Tsalikov (1967)
 Andrei Zazroyev (1968–1970)
 Kazbek Tuaev (1970)
 Sergei Korshunov (1971)
 Dmitri Chikhradze (1971)
 Andrei Zazroyev (1972)
 Ivan Larin (1973)
 Kazbek Tuaev (1974–1977)
 Viktor Belov (1977–1978)
 Mussa Tsalikov (1978–1980)
 Andrei Zazroyev (1980–1981)
 Aleksandr Kochetkov (1982)
 Valeri Maslov (1983)
 Ivan Varlamov (1984)
 Valeri Ovchinnikov (1985–1986)
 Igor Zazroyev (1986–1987)
 Oleg Romantsev (1988)
 Valeriy Gazzaev (1989–1991)
 Nikolay Khudiyev (1991)
 Aleksandr Novikov (1992–1993)
 Valeriy Gazzaev (1994–1999)
 Vladimir Gutsaev (2000)
 Aleksandr Averyanov (2000–2001)
 Aleksandr Yanovskiy (2001–2002)
 Volodymyr Muntyan (2002)
 Bakhva Tedeyev (2002)
 Revaz Dzodzuashvili (2003)
 Nikolay Khudiyev (2003)
 Bakhva Tedeyev (2003–2004)
 Rolland Courbis (2004–2005)
 Yuri Sekinaev (2004)
 Bakhva Tedeyev (2005)
 Edgar Gess (2005)
 Itzhak Shum (2005)
 Aleksandr Yanovskiy (2005–2006)
 Boris Stukalov (2006–2007)
 Stanislav Tskhovrebov (2007-2008)
 Valery Petrakov (2009)
 Mircea Rednic (2009)
 Vladimir Shevchuk (2010–2011)
 Vladimir Gazzayev (2011–2012)
 Valeriy Gazzaev (2012–2014)
 Artur Pagayev (2014–2015)
 Zaur Tedeyev (2015–2016)
 Fyodor Gagloyev (2016)
 Marat Dzoblayev (2016-2017)
 Yuri Gazzaev (2018)
 Spartak Gogniyev (2019–Current)

Notable players

Soviet Union/Russia

 Valeriy Gazzaev
  Stanislav Cherchesov
  Zaur Khapov
  Viktor Bulatov
  Vasili Baranov
  Victor Onopko
  Yuri Kovtun
  Artur Pagayev
  Bakhva Tedeev
  Omari Tetradze
 Soslan Dzhanayev

 Igor Yanovsky
 Spartak Gogniyev
 Alan Kasaev

Georgia

 Mikhail Kavelashvili
 Giorgi Demetradze
 Murtaz Shelia
 Mikheil Ashvetia
 Levan Kobiashvili
 Mamuka Kobakhidze
 Giorgi Chanturia

Uzbekistan

 Mirjalol Qosimov

Hungary

 Tamás Priskin

Belarus

  Renan Bressan

Tajikistan

 Rahmatullo Fuzailov

Ivory Coast

 Dacosta Goore

Nigeria

 Isaac Okoronkwo
 Sani Kaita
 Justice Christopher

Bosnia and Herzegovina 
 Ognjen Vranješ
 Zajko Zeba
 Vladan Grujić

Lithuania

 Deividas Semberas

Burkina Faso

 Ibrahim Gnanou

Romania

 George Florescu
 Cristian Tudor

El Salvador

 Rodolfo Zelaya

Netherlands

 Royston Drenthe

Azerbaijan

 Nazim Suleymanov

Moldova

 Sergiu Dadu

New Zealand

 Kosta Barbarouses

References

1921 establishments in Russia
2020 establishments in Russia
Association football clubs established in 1921
Association football clubs disestablished in 2020
Defunct football clubs in Russia
Sport in Vladikavkaz
Soviet Top League clubs